Hurvin Michael McCormack (born April 6, 1972) is a former American football defensive tackle in the National Football League for the Dallas Cowboys and Cleveland Browns. He played college football at Indiana University.

Early years
McCormack attended New Dorp High School where he played . As a senior, he tallied 58 tackles and 8 sacks, on his way to being named All-conference, All- Staten Island and All-district.

He accepted a football scholarship from Indiana University. As a sophomore, he started 11 games at defensive tackle and had 32 tackles. As a junior, he posted 36 tackles (ninth on the team), 23 solo tackles, 6 sacks and 8 tackles for loss.

As a senior, he appeared in only 9 games, recording 38 tackles (26 solo), 7 sacks and 9 tackles for loss. He finished his college career with 114 tackles and 16 sacks, which ranked fourth in school history at the time.

Professional career

Dallas Cowboys
McCormack was signed as an undrafted free agent by the Dallas Cowboys after the 1994 NFL draft. He appeared in 4 games as a rookie, collecting one quarterback sack.

In 1995, he was moved to defensive end during training camp. In the regular season, he play both at defensive end and defensive tackle. His first start came in place of an injured Russell Maryland in the ninth game against the Philadelphia Eagles, posting 6 tackles (5 solo), one sack and 2 quarterback pressures. His second start came in the fifteenth game against the New York Giants, making 3 solo tackles and one quarterback pressure. He finished the season with 22 tackles, 2 sacks, 2 tackles for loss and 9 quarterback pressures. He tore his right posterior cruciate ligament late in Super Bowl XXX, while moving in for a sack.

In 1996, he started 3 games at right defensive end in place of an injured Charles Haley and one game at right defensive tackle to compensate for an injured Chad Hennings. He registered 21 tackles, 2.5 sacks and 11 quarterback pressures (sixth on the team). He had rotator cuff surgery on his right shoulder at the end of the season. 

In 1997, he made 19 tackles, 0.5 sacks, one tackle for loss and 8 quarterback pressures (third on the team). He was declared inactive for the last 3 games of the season.

In 1998, he ranked second on the team with 5 sacks. He was left unprotected in the 1999 NFL expansion draft.

Cleveland Browns
McCormack was the second overall pick in the 1999 NFL expansion draft. He started four games in the season that the Cleveland Browns returned to the National Football League. He wasn't re-signed at the end of the year.

Personal life
McCormack has three children (Myles, Milani, and Davin). He is currently the VP for the NFLPA NY/NJ Chapter.

References

1972 births
Living people
Sportspeople from Brooklyn
Players of American football from New York City
American football defensive tackles
Indiana Hoosiers football players
Dallas Cowboys players
Cleveland Browns players
New Dorp High School alumni